Bernicia was originally the Brittonic Celtic kingdom of Bryneich from the late 4th century and later the Anglo-Saxon kingdom of 'Bernicia' established by Anglian conquerors of the late 6th century in what is now southeastern Scotland and North East England.

The Anglian territory of Bernicia was approximately equivalent to the modern English counties of Northumberland, Tyne and Wear, and Durham, as well as the Scottish counties of Berwickshire and East Lothian, stretching from the Forth to the Tees. In the early 7th century, it merged with its southern neighbour, Deira, to form the kingdom of Northumbria, and its borders subsequently expanded considerably.

Brittonic Bryneich

Etymologies
Bernicia occurs in Old Welsh poetry as Bryneich or Brynaich and in the 9th-century Historia Brittonum, (§ 61) as Berneich or Birneich. This was most likely the name of the native Brittonic kingdom , whose name was then adopted by the Anglian settlers who rendered it in Old English as Bernice or Beornice . The counter hypothesis suggesting these names represent a Brythonic adaption of an earlier English form is considered less probable .

Local linguistic evidence suggests continued political activity in the area from the time of the Roman retreat from Britain and before the arrival of the Angles. Important Anglian centres in Bernicia bear names of British Celtic origin, or are known by British names elsewhere: Bamburgh is called Din Guaire in the Historia Brittonum; Dunbar (where Saint Wilfrid was once imprisoned) represents Dinbaer; and the name of Coldingham is given by Bede as Coludi urbs ("town of Colud"), where Colud seems to represent the British Celtic form, possibly for the hill-fort of St Abb's Head.

Analysis of a potential derivation has not produced a consensus. The most commonly cited etymology gives the meaning as "Land of the Mountain Passes" or "Land of the Gaps" (tentatively proposed by Kenneth H. Jackson). An earlier derivation from the tribal name of the Brigantes has been dismissed as linguistically unsound. In 1997 John T. Koch suggested the conflation of a probable primary form *Bernech with the native form *Brïγent for the old civitas Brigantum as a result of Anglian expansion in that territory during the 7th century.

Political history and memory
The Brythonic kingdom of the area was formed from what had once been the southern lands of the Votadini, possibly as part of the division of a supposed 'great northern realm' of Coel Hen in c. AD 420. This northern realm is referred to by Welsh scholars as Yr Hen Ogledd or, literally, "The Old North". The kingdom may have been ruled from the site that later became the English Bamburgh, which certainly features in Welsh sources as Din Guardi. Near this high-status residence lay the island of Lindisfarne (formerly known, in Welsh, as Ynys Metcaut), which became the seat of the Bernician bishops. It is unknown when the Angles finally conquered the whole region, but around 604 is likely.

Kings of British Bryneich
There are several Old Welsh pedigrees of princely "Men of the North" (Gwŷr y Gogledd) that may represent the kings of the British kingdom in the area, which may have been called Bryneich. John Morris surmised that the line of a certain Morcant Bulc referred to these monarchs, chiefly because he identified this man as the murderer of Urien Rheged who was, at the time, besieging Lindisfarne.

English Bernicia

Some of the Angles of Bernicia may have been employed as mercenaries along Hadrian's Wall during the late Roman period. Others are thought to have migrated north (by sea) from Deira ( or Dere) in the early 6th century. The first Anglian king in the historical record is Ida, who is said to have obtained the throne and the kingdom about 547. His sons spent many years fighting a united force from the surrounding Brythonic kingdoms until their alliance collapsed into civil war.

A forcibly united Northumbria
Ida's grandson, Æthelfrith (Æðelfriþ), united Deira with his own kingdom by force around the year 604. He ruled the two kingdoms (united as Northumbria) until he was defeated and killed by Rædwald of East Anglia (who had given refuge to Edwin, son of Ælle, king of Deira) around the year 616. Edwin then became king. The early part of Edwin's reign was possibly spent fighting enemies from the Brythonic exiles of the old British kingdom, operating out of Gododdin. After this, it is said that on Easter Day 627 that Edwin converted to Christianity in return for Elmet (a Cumbric-speaking kingdom that once existed in the modern-day West Riding of Yorkshire, near Leeds), joining the kingdom of Northumbria; which drew him into direct conflict with Wales proper.

Following the disastrous Battle of Hatfield Chase on 12 October 633, in which Edwin was defeated and killed by Cadwallon ap Cadfan of Gwynedd and Penda of Mercia, Northumbria was divided back into Bernicia and Deira. Bernicia was then briefly ruled by Eanfrith, son of Æthelfrith, but after about a year he went to Cadwallon to sue for peace and was killed. Eanfrith's brother Oswald then raised an army and finally defeated Cadwallon at the Battle of Heavenfield in 634.

After this victory, Oswald appears to have been recognised by both Bernicians and Deirans as king of a properly united Northumbria. The kings of Bernicia were thereafter supreme in that kingdom, although Deira had its own sub-kings at times during the reigns of Oswiu and his son Ecgfrith.

Rump of Northumbria, 866–973 

After the decisive defeat of Northumbrian forces by the Viking Great Heathen Army, at York in 867, the united Kingdom of Northumbria disintegrated. Most of Bernicia remained a de facto independent kingdom called Bamburgh after the stronghold of its high-reeves. In 927 Ealdred accepted West Saxon overlordship, but Bamburgh periodically regained de facto independence in periods when Wessex lost control of the Anglo-Scandinavian Norse Kingdom of York in modern day Yorkshire until England was united in 954.

In 973, Scots sovereignty over northern Bernicia, now known as Lothian, was acknowledged by Edgar of England.

Kings of Bernicia

(see also List of monarchs of Northumbria)

Ida, son of Eoppa (547–559)
Glappa, possibly Ida's brother (559–560)
Adda, son of Ida (560–568)
Æthelric, son of Ida (568–572)
Theodric, son of Ida (572–579)
Frithuwald, possibly Adda's son (579–585)
Hussa, possibly Adda's son (585–593)
Æthelfrith, son of Æthelric (593–616)

Under Deiran rule 616–633)
Eanfrith of Bernicia, son of Æthelfrith (633–634)

Under Oswald son of Æthelfrith, Bernicia was united with Deira to form Northumbria from 634 onward until the Viking invasion of the 9th Century.

Notes

References 
 Bede, Historia ecclesiastica gentis Anglorum.
 Jackson, Kenneth H. (1953). Language and History in Early Britain. Edinburgh University Press.
 Jackson, Kenneth H. (1969). The Gododdin: The Oldest Scottish poem. Edinburgh: Edinburgh University Press.
 Koch, John T. (1997). The Gododdin of Aneurin: Text and context from Dark-Age North Britain. Cardiff: University of Wales Press. 
 Rollason, David W. (2003). Northumbria, 500–1100: Creation and Destruction of a Kingdom. Cambridge. .

Further reading 
 Alcock, Leslie, Kings and Warriors, Craftsmen and Priests in Northern Britain AD 550–850. Society of Antiquaries of Scotland, Edinburgh, 2003. 
 Alcock, Leslie, Arthur's Britain: History and Archaeology, AD 367–634. Penguin, London, 1989. 
 Higham, N.J., The Kingdom of Northumbria AD 350–1100. Sutton, Stroud, 1993. 
 Lowe, Chris, The Making of Scotland: Angels, Fools and Tyrants: Britons and Angles in Southern Scotland. Canongate, Edinburgh, 1999. 
 Morris, John, The Age of Arthur. Weidenfeld & Nicolson, London, 1973. 
 Rollason, David, Northumbria, 500–1100: Creation and Destruction of a Kingdom.  2008.
 Ziegler, Michelle. "The Politics of Exile in Early Northumbria." The Heroic Age 2 (1999). Online.

Northumbria
Peoples of Anglo-Saxon England
History of Northumberland
States and territories established in the 6th century
6th century in Scotland
7th century in Scotland
6th-century establishments in England
7th century in England
History of the Scottish Borders
States and territories disestablished in the 7th century
630s disestablishments
Former kingdoms